The Man on the Hill (MOTH) locality of northwestern Canada has fossils that are very well preserved and have had a profound impact on the understanding of vertebrate evolution. The geology of the MOTH locality consists of fine, alternating laminae of light grey argillaceous limestone, or calcareous shale, and dark grey silt to sand-rich calcareous shale, as observed in thin section, and the characterization of the lithology for the vertebrate-bearing strata as an interlaminated argillaceous limestone and calcareous shale. The abundance of cryptic trace fossils and the presence of pyrite suggest that the intra-shelf topographic sag at MOTH had restricted circulation and was generally hypoxic (Zorn et al. 2005).

The MOTH locality (62°32' N, 127°45' W) is located in the Central Mackenzie Mountains, approximately 70 km northeast of Tungsten, Northwest Territories, Canada (Hanke 2008). The MOTH locality was named after a pile of rocks resembling a human sitting on a ridge (Man-on-the-Hill) (Adrain & Wilson 1994). The locality is on the southwest limb of the Grizzly Bear anticline in rocks which are thought to be transitional between the Road River Formation and the Delorme Group (Adrain & Wilson 1994). Gabrielse et al. (1973) provided the original description of the structural geology, lithological features, and associated invertebrate and vertebrate fossils in the measured section at MOTH.  The marine rocks preserved in the Mackenzie Mountains were deposited in spatially extensive sedimentary units, including the Whittaker, Delorme, and Road River formations (Perry 1984; Morrow & Geldsetzer 1988) that fringed the western margin of Laurussia (the combined Laurentian and Baltic regions) during the Late Silurian and Early Devonian (Copeland 1978; Chatterton & Perry 1983).

References

Fossils of Canada
Paleontology in the Northwest Territories